Basabari is an area of the town of Bagerhat in southwestern Bangladesh. It is located in Bagerhat Sadar Upazila of Bagerhat District, Khulna Division.

References 

Populated places in Khulna Division